The goalkeeper (abbreviated as GK, keeper, ‘keeps’, goalie, or the longer version of goal-keeper) is a position in association football. It is the most specialised position in the sport. The goalkeeper's main role is to stop the opposing team from scoring (putting the ball over the goal-line of the goal). This is accomplished by having the goalkeeper move into the trajectory of the ball to either catch it or direct it further from the vicinity of the goal line. Within the penalty area goalkeepers are allowed to use their hands, giving them (outside throw-ins) the sole rights on the field to handle the ball. The goalkeeper is indicated by wearing a different coloured kit from their teammates and opposition.

The back-pass rule is a rule that disallows handling passes back to keepers from teammates in most cases. Goalkeepers usually perform goal kicks, and also give commands to their defence during corner kicks, direct and indirect free kicks, and marking. Goalkeepers play an important role in directing on field strategy as they have an unrestricted view of the entire pitch, giving them a unique perspective on play development.

The goalkeeper is the only mandatory position of a team. If they are injured or sent off, another player must take their place. In order to replace a goalkeeper who is sent off, a team usually brings on a substitute keeper in place of an outfield player and play the rest of the match with nine outfield players. If a team does not have a substitute goalkeeper, or they have already used all of their permitted substitutions for the match, an outfield player has to take the dismissed goalkeeper's place and wear the goalkeeper shirt.

Because the position requires different skills from the outfielders, goalkeepers train separately from their teammates and often work with a goalkeeping coach to develop their play. While outfielders typically must be in good cardiovascular shape to play up to 90 minutes in a match, a goalkeeper must be able to move quick and have fast feet for little bursts. During a match, goalkeepers may get a lot of action, usually in brief intervals, until their teammates can clear the ball out of the zone. During practice, goalkeepers focus heavily on footwork and being able to get up quickly after a save is made. It is important that a goalkeeper is able to get set, meaning feet shoulder width apart and on their toes, before the next shot comes their way, so they are able to react and make the save.

The squad number for a first-choice goalkeeper is commonly number 1, although they may wear any number between 1 and 99.

History

Association football, like many sports, has experienced many changes in tactics resulting in the generation and elimination of different positions. Goalkeeper is the only position that is certain to have existed since the codification of the sport. Even in the early days of organised football, when systems were limited or non-existent and the main idea was for all players to attack and defend, teams had a designated member to play as the goalkeeper.

The earliest account of football teams with player positions comes from Richard Mulcaster in 1581 and does not specify goalkeepers. The earliest specific reference to keeping goal comes from Cornish Hurling in 1602. According to Carew: "they pitch two bushes in the ground, some eight or ten foot asunder; and directly against them, ten or twelve score off, other twayne in like distance, which they term their Goals. One of these is appointed by lots, to the one side, and the other to his adverse party. There is assigned for their guard, a couple of their best stopping Hurlers". Other references to scoring goals begin in English literature in the early 17th century; for example, in John Day's play The Blind Beggar of Bethnal Green (performed circa 1600; published 1659): "I'll play a gole at camp-ball" (an extremely violent variety of football, popular in East Anglia). Similarly, in a 1613 poem, Michael Drayton refers to "when the Ball to throw, And drive it to the Gole, in squadrons forth they goe". It seems inevitable that wherever a game has evolved goals, some form of goalkeeping must also be developed. David Wedderburn refers to what has been translated from Latin as to "keep goal" in 1633, though this does not necessarily imply a fixed goalkeeper position.

The word "goal-keeper" is used in the novel Tom Brown's School Days (published in 1857, but set in the 1830s). The author is here referring to an early form of rugby football: 

The word "goal-keeper" appeared in the Sheffield Rules of 1867, but the term did not refer to a designated player, but rather to "that player on the defending side who for the time being is nearest to his own goal". The goal-keeper, thus defined, did not enjoy any special handling privileges.

The FA's first Laws of the Game of 1863 did not make any special provision for a goalkeeper, with any player being allowed to catch or knock-on the ball. Handling the ball was completely forbidden (for all players) in 1870. The next year, 1871, the laws were amended to introduce the goalkeeper and specify that the keeper was allowed to handle the ball "for the protection of his goal". The restrictions on the ability of the goalkeeper to handle the ball were changed several times in subsequent revisions of the laws:

 1871: the keeper may handle the ball only "for the protection of his goal".
 1873: the keeper may not "carry" the ball.
 1883: the keeper may not carry the ball for more than two steps.
 1887: the keeper may not handle the ball in the opposition's half.
 1901: the keeper may handle the ball for any purpose (not only in defence of the goal).
 1912: the keeper may handle the ball only in the penalty area.
 1931: the keeper may take up to four steps (rather than two) while carrying the ball.
 1992: the keeper may not handle the ball after it has been deliberately kicked to him/her by a team-mate.
 1997: the keeper may not handle the ball for more than six seconds.

Initially, goalkeepers typically played between the goalposts and had limited mobility, except when trying to save opposition shots. Throughout the years, the role of the goalkeeper has evolved, due to the changes in systems of play, to become more active. The goalkeeper is the only player in association football allowed to use their hands to control the ball (other than when restarting play with a throw-in).

During the 1935–36 English football season, young Sunderland AFC goalkeeper of the team, Jimmy Thorpe, died as a result of a kick in the head and chest after he had picked up the ball following a backpass in a game against Chelsea at Roker Park. He continued to take part until the match finished, but collapsed at home afterwards and died in hospital four days later from diabetes mellitus and heart failure "accelerated by the rough usage of the opposing team". The tragic end to Thorpe's career led to a change in the rules, where players were no longer allowed to raise their foot to a goalkeeper when he had control of the ball in his arms.

Due to several time-wasting techniques which were used by goalkeepers, such as bouncing the ball on the ground or throwing it in the air and then catching it again, in the 1960s, the Laws of the game were revised further, and the goalkeeper was given a maximum of four steps to travel while holding, bouncing or throwing the ball in the air and catching it again, without having to release it into play. The FIFA Board later also devised an anti-parrying rule, saying that such deliberate parrying for the purpose of evading the Law was to be regarded also as holding the ball.

In 1992, the International Football Association Board made changes in the laws of the game that affected goalkeepers – notably the back-pass rule, which prohibits goalkeepers from handling the ball when receiving a deliberate pass from a teammate that is made with their feet. This rule change was made to discourage time-wasting and overly defensive play after the 1990 FIFA World Cup which was described as exceedingly dull, rife with back-passing and goalkeepers holding the ball. Also, goalkeepers would frequently drop the ball and dribble it around, only to pick it up again once opponents came closer to put them under pressure, a typical time-wasting technique. Therefore, another rule was introduced at the same time as the back-pass rule. This rule prohibits goalkeepers from handling the ball again once the ball released for play; an offence results in an indirect free kick to the opposition. Furthermore, any player negating the spirit of the new rule would be likely to be cautioned for unsporting behaviour and punished by an indirect free-kick.

On 1 July 1997, FIFA decided to extend the back-pass rule by applying it also to throw-ins from defenders to their own goalkeeper; in order to prevent further time-wasting, FIFA also established that if a goalkeeper holds the ball for more than five or six seconds the referee must adjudge this as time-wasting and award an indirect free-kick to the opposing team, although in practice the "six second rule" is rarely enforced on a literal 6 second count from the moment they control the ball as written in the laws, and instead when enforced it is often after a longer timeframe involving the goal keeper faking throws, kicks or running around the penalty area. An example of this rule in a high profile match was at the London 2012 Summer Olympics Women's Football semi-final game between the United States and Canada. With Canada in front 3–2 late in the game, their goalkeeper Erin McLeod grabbed the ball from a corner kick then held onto it for 10 seconds despite being warned by the referee not to waste time. The indirect free kick resulted in a penalty being called for a handball offence, which was scored to make it 3–3 and take the game to extra time, where the United States won the game 4–3.

Laws of the Game and general play 

The position of goalkeeper is the only position in the game which is technically distinct from the others in the course of normal play. The Laws of the Game distinguish the goalkeeper from the other players in several ways, most significantly exempting them from the prohibition on handling the ball, though only within their own penalty area. Once a goalkeeper has control of the ball in their hands, opponents are not permitted to challenge them. Goalkeepers have a specialized role as the sole defender against a penalty kick. Goalkeepers are required to wear distinct colors from other players, and are permitted to wear caps and tracksuit bottoms.

The Laws mandate that one player on the team must be designated as the goalkeeper at all times, meaning that if a goalkeeper is sent off or injured and unable to continue, another player must assume the goalkeeper position. The Laws allow for teams to change the player designated as goalkeeper at stoppages in play, but in practice this is rarely exercised.

The Laws place no restrictions on a goalkeeper leaving their penalty area and acting as an ordinary player, though generally goalkeepers stay close to their goals throughout matches.

Goalkeepers routinely perform extension dives. To execute this, they push off the ground with the foot nearest to the ball, launching themselves into a horizontal position. At this point, the ball may be caught or parried away from the goal. In the latter case, a good goalkeeper will attempt to ensure that the rebound cannot be taken by a player of the opposing team, although this is not always possible.

Because goalkeepers can spend the majority of a match without much action they need very good concentration in the event of the opposition going on the attack at any one time. Goalkeepers also need good 'anticipation' meaning they can 'read' where the ball is going to go and react by moving before the ball is kicked or headed and quickly decide whenever to catch, punch or palm the ball.

Responsibilities

The tactical responsibilities of goalkeepers include:

 To keep goal by physically blocking attempted shots with any part of their body. The keeper is permitted to play the ball anywhere on the field, but may not handle the ball using hands or outstretched arms outside of their penalty area.
 To organise the team's defenders during defensive set pieces such as free kicks and corners. In the case of free kicks, this includes picking the numbers and the organisation of a defensive player "wall". The wall serves to provide a physical barrier to the incoming ball, but some goalkeepers position their walls in certain positions to tempt kick-takers to certain types of shots. Occasionally, goalkeepers may opt to dispense with the wall. Some goalkeepers are also entrusted with the responsibility of picking markers while defending at set pieces.
 To pick out crosses and attempted long passes either by collecting them in flight or punching them clear if heavily challenged by opposing strikers.

Although goalkeepers have special privileges, including the ability to handle the ball in the penalty area, they are otherwise subject to the same rules as any other player.

Playmaking and attack

Goalkeepers are not required to stay in the penalty area; they may get involved in play anywhere on the pitch, and it is common for them to act as an additional defender (or 'sweeper') during certain passages of the game. Goalkeepers with a long throwing range or accurate long-distance kicks may be able to quickly create attacking positions for a team and generate goal-scoring chances from defensive situations, a tactic known as the long ball.

Sweeper-keeper
 
Gyula Grosics from the Hungary "Golden Team" of the 1950s was thought to be the first goalkeeper to play as the 'sweeper-keeper'. Tommy Lawrence has also been credited with revolutionising the role of the goalkeeper by effectively acting as an 11th outfield player. The rushing playing style used by Liverpool legend Bruce Grobbelaar seen during the 1980s–90s makes him one of the original sweeper-keepers of the modern era. René Higuita was another who became known for his unorthodox, skillful but sometimes reckless techniques. Manuel Neuer has been described as a sweeper-keeper due to his speed and unique style of play which occasionally includes him acting as a sweeper for his team by rushing off his line to anticipate opposing forwards who have beaten the offside trap. With his excellent ball control and distribution, which enables him to start plays from the back, he has said he could play in the German third division as a centre-back if he wanted to. Hugo Lloris of Tottenham Hotspur and France and former goalkeepers Fabien Barthez and Edwin van der Sar, have also been described as sweeper-keepers, while Claudio Bravo and Ederson Moraes have even been described as playmakers in the media.

Other players who have been labelled "sweeper-keepers" in the media include Marc-Andre Ter Stegen of FC Barcelona and Germany, Spanish former goalkeeper Víctor Valdés, and former Soviet keeper Lev Yashin, the latter of whom is often cited by pundits as one of the goalkeepers who pioneered the role of the sweeper-keeper. Sweeper-keepers have been popularised by managers who usually employ tactics inspired by total football, such as Johan Cruyff and Pep Guardiola, for example, and are chosen not only for their shot-stopping and goalkeeping abilities, but also due to their skill with the ball at their feet, their ability to pick out passes and contribute to the build-up play of their team, and their speed when rushing out of the penalty area to anticipate opponents, which enables their team to maintain a high defensive line. It is not without risk, as a goalkeeper being so far from the penalty area can lead to spectacular long range lob goals if they or their team lose possession, as well as risking being red carded if they run out to challenge an opponent but foul them or handball a shot by mistake.

Goalscorers

Some goalkeepers have scored goals. Other than by accident when a long kicked clearance reaches the other end of the field and evades the opposing goalkeeper with the aid of strong winds and/or unexpected bounces, this most commonly occurs where a goalkeeper has rushed up to the opposite end of the pitch to give his team a numerical advantage in attack, leaving his own goal undefended. As such, it is normally only done late in a game at set-pieces where the consequences of scoring far outweigh those of conceding a further goal, such as for a team trailing in a knock-out tournament.

Some goalkeepers, such as Higuita, Rogério Ceni, Hans-Jörg Butt and José Luis Chilavert, are also expert set-piece takers. These players may take their team's attacking free kicks or penalties. Rogério Ceni, São Paulo's goalkeeper from 1992 to 2015, has scored 132 goals in his career, more than many outfield players.

Equipment and attire

Goalkeepers must wear kit that distinguishes them clearly from other players and match officials, as this is all that the FIFA Laws of the Game require. Some goalkeepers have received recognition for their match attire, like Lev Yashin of the Soviet Union, who was nicknamed the "Black Spider" for his distinctive all-black outfit; Klaus Lindenberger of Austria, who designed his own variation of a clown's costume; Jorge Campos of Mexico, who was popular for his colourful attire; Raul Plassmann of Cruzeiro Esporte Clube and his all-yellow outfit; and Gábor Király for wearing a pair of grey tracksuit bottoms instead of shorts.

Although it was initially more common for goalkeepers to wear long-sleeved jerseys, recently several goalkeepers, such as Gianluigi Buffon, have also been known to wear short sleeves.

Most goalkeepers also wear gloves to improve their grip on the ball, and to protect themselves from injury. Some gloves now include rigid plastic spines down each finger to help prevent injuries such as jammed, fractured, and sprained fingers. Though gloves are not mandatory attire, it is uncommon for goalkeepers to opt against them due to the advantages they offer. At UEFA Euro 2004, Portuguese goalkeeper Ricardo famously took off his gloves during the quarter-final penalty shoot-out against England, knowing he was the next taker for his side. He then went on to save Darius Vassell's penalty using his bare hands before scoring his own kick to win it for Portugal.

Though rare, goalkeepers are permitted to wear visored headgear (such as a baseball cap) to minimize glare from bright sunlight, or a knit cap to insulate from cold weather, at any time if they elect to do so. After recovering from a near-fatal skull fracture that he had sustained in 2006, Petr Čech wore a rugby-style scrum cap during his matches for the rest of his playing career.

Careers and injuries

Goalkeepers have a very physically demanding job. They are the only players allowed to use their hands, except for throw-ins. Because of this, goalkeepers are often injured during breakaways, corner kicks, and free kicks since they put their bodies on the line. Several famous goalkeepers have been injured in ways their counterparts could not possibly sustain. For example, Petr Čech received a head injury after colliding with another player during a 2006 game. A couple of months later he debuted wearing a rugby-style headpiece. However, some goalkeepers manage to avoid injury and continue to play, many not retiring until their late 30s or early 40s. Notably, Peter Shilton played for 31 years between 1966 and 1997 before retiring at the age of 47.

In general, goalkeepers can sustain any injury to which their outfield counterparts are vulnerable. Common lower and upper extremity injuries include cartilage tears, anterior cruciate ligament tears, and knee sprains. On the other hand, goalkeepers rarely fall victim to fatigue-related injuries, such as leg cramps, pulled hamstrings, and dehydration. Shoulder injuries can be caused by heavy contact with the ground and can cause significant long term injuries as loss of the range of motion can cause a complete inability to do their job. Vedran Janjetovic suffered such a contact injury playing in an A-League match on 25 January 2019 after diving to make a save. After playing nine games on painkilling injections he underwent experimental surgery that required a two and a half year recovery and caused him to miss two entire seasons.

Records

Goalkeepers are crucial in penalty shoot-outs. The record for most penalties saved in a shoot-out is held solely by Ugandan, Denis Onyango. He saved five penalty shootout kicks to help his club, Mamelodi Sundowns edge Cape Town City 3–2 on penalties at the MTN 8 tournament in South Africa in October 2021.

Second spot is shared by Helmuth Duckadam of Steaua București in the 1986 European Cup Final against Barcelona, and Ciarán Kelly for Sligo Rovers against Shamrock Rovers in the 2010 FAI Cup Final, both of whom who saved all four penalties faced.

Ray Clemence holds the record for the most clean sheets in the history of football, with 460 in more than 1000 official matches 

Stefano Tacconi is the only goalkeeper to have won all official club competitions for which he was eligible. Goalkeeper Ned Doig, who spent most of his career with Sunderland, set a 19th-century world record by not conceding any goals in 87 of his 290 top division appearances (30%).

Rogério Ceni has scored the most goals for a goalkeeper, having recorded 131 goals through free kicks and penalties across his 23-year career. Tony Read and José Luis Chilavert are the only goalkeepers to score a hat-trick (three goals in a game), with all three goals coming from penalty kicks.

Gianluigi Buffon is the only goalkeeper to have won the UEFA Club Footballer of the Year Award. Oliver Kahn holds the record for most UEFA Best Club Goalkeeper and Best European Goalkeeper Awards, with four. Iker Casillas holds the record for most appearances by a goalkeeper in the FIFPro World11 and in the UEFA Team of the Year, as well as most IFFHS World's Best Goalkeeper Awards, alongside Buffon and Manuel Neuer, winning the award for five consecutive years between 2008 and 2012. Casillas holds the record for the most clean sheets in UEFA Champions League history.

At the international level, Dino Zoff has remained unbeaten for the longest period of time, whilst Walter Zenga holds the record for longest unbeaten run in a FIFA World Cup tournament at 517 minutes. Gianluigi Buffon, Fabien Barthez and Iker Casillas hold the record for fewest goals conceded by a winning goalkeeper in a World Cup tournament at two each. Buffon is the only World Cup–winning goalkeeper not to have conceded a goal in open play throughout the entire tournament, one goal having resulted from an own goal after a free kick, the other from a penalty. Fabien Barthez and Peter Shilton hold the record for most clean sheets in World Cup matches, with ten each. Mohamed Al-Deayea holds the record for most international caps by a male goalkeeper, with one 178 official appearances for Saudi Arabia. Hope Solo of the United States holds the record for most international caps by a female goalkeeper, with 202 appearances.

Pascal Zuberbühler holds the record for fewest goals conceded by a goalkeeper in a World Cup tournament, and also went a record five successive matches at an international tournament without conceding a goal. He did not concede a goal in 463 minutes of World Cup play against France, Korea, and Togo—making Switzerland the only team in the history of the tournament not to concede a goal in normal time. Tim Howard holds the record for most saves made in a FIFA World Cup match, with sixteen against Belgium in the round of 16 of the 2014 tournament. Oliver Kahn is the only goalkeeper to have won the Adidas Golden Ball for the best player of the tournament in a World Cup doing so in 2002. Lev Yashin is the only goalkeeper to have won the Ballon d'Or, given to the best player of the year. In 2021, Gianluigi Donnarumma became the first goalkeeper to win the player of the tournament award at UEFA Euro 2020. Gianluca Pagliuca of Italy became the first goalkeeper to be sent off in a World Cup finals match, dismissed for handling outside his area against Norway in 1994. His team went on to win 1–0 and reached the final before losing to Brazil in a penalty shoot-out, in which Pagliuca became the first goalkeeper ever to stop a penalty in a World Cup Final shoot-out.

Iker Casillas holds both the record for fewest goals conceded in a UEFA European Championship (only one in 2012), and the record for longest unbeaten run at a European Championship, beating the previous record held by Dino Zoff. He also holds the records for most international clean sheets (102) by a male goalkeeper, beating the previous record held by Edwin van der Sar (72), and became the first goalkeeper in history, male or female, to keep 100 clean sheets at international level in 2015; he also shares with Hope Solo the overall men's and women's record for most international clean sheets. Buffon holds the record for most minutes without conceding a goal in European Championship qualifying matches at 644. 

On 26 February 1983, Pat Jennings became the first player to make 1,000 senior appearances in English football. In the 1986 World Cup, held in Mexico, he was turning 41, making him the World Cup's oldest-ever participant at the time. In 1976, PFA awarded him the Players' Player of the Year award making him the first goalkeeper to ever receive this accolade.

Highest fees
, the most expensive goalkeeper of all time is Kepa Arrizabalaga, following his 2018 €80 million (£71 million) transfer to Chelsea from Athletic Bilbao.

See also
Awards
 Best European Goalkeeper
 FIFA World Cup All-Star Teams
 Golden Glove awards
 IFFHS World's Best Goalkeeper
 The Best FIFA Goalkeeper
 UEFA Best Club Goalkeeper Award

Other
 Association football positions
 List of goalscoring goalkeepers
 List of most expensive association football transfers
 List of outfield association footballers who played in goal

Notes

References

External links

Goalkeeping
 
Association football positions
Association football terminology
Association football player non-biographical articles